U.S. Route 66 through Williams, Arizona began as a dirt street in the center of town which was
later cindered and then paved. Despite some modern encroachments, most of U.S. Route 66
through Williams is lined with properties dating from the historic period. The four
block long Williams Historic Business District was listed on the National Register of Historic Places on December 20, 1984.

It is flanked on the east and west by a
commercial strip with motels, service stations, and restaurants dating to the 1920s,
1930s, and 1940s. One block of this commercial strip is west of the business
district, and four blocks are to the east. The distribution and construction dates
of these associated properties in Williams are directly related to construction of
U.S. Route 66.

Unlike many stretches of U.S. Route 66 today, it is a good example of what the highway "looked like" during its heyday.

Williams continues to cater to the tourist trade, although Interstate 40 bypassed
Route 66 on October 13, 1984.

References

Roads on the National Register of Historic Places in Arizona
Buildings and structures in Coconino County, Arizona
Williams
National Register of Historic Places in Coconino County, Arizona
Williams, Arizona